Nepal participated in the 1998 Asian Games held in Bangkok, Thailand from December 6, 1998 to December 20, 1998. Athletes from Nepal succeeded in winning four total medals -- one silver and three bronzes. Nepal finished twenty-seventh in a medal table.

References

Nations at the 1998 Asian Games
1998
Asian Games